Cooking with the Stars is a British competitive cooking reality television series. It began airing on 13 July 2021 on ITV and is presented by Emma Willis and Tom Allen. It was renewed for a second series that is set to premiere on 7 June 2022.

Format
Eight celebrities are paired with a professional chef who becomes their mentor. The celebrities then compete against each other in a number of cooking battles where they prepare a range of different dishes. During cooking, they have the option to bang the gong (golden frying pan) which allows their mentor to step in and help for two minutes. The mentor chefs also act as the judges, and rate the other celebrity cooks, deciding the winner(s) who will be advancing to the next round, and the losers who are forced to compete in the cook-off. In the cook-off, the bottom two prepare the same dish, with no help from their mentor, in a bid to remain in the competition. The cook-off is judged by a blind taste test, meaning the chefs do not know which celebrity has cooked each dish and therefore potentially allowing them to send their own celebrity home.

Production
In April 2021, ITV announced the commissioning of Cooking with the Stars, a six-part entertainment cooking competition created by South Shore Productions with funding by Marks & Spencer. The series was teased as featuring "eight celebrities, each paired with an accomplished chef who will mentor, teach and take them from passionate amateur to restaurant level chefs." The series is filmed at Pinewood Studios.

Series 1 (2021)
The celebrities competing in the first series, along with their professional chef mentors were announced on 17 May 2021. The series was won by Harry Judd, who was mentored by Nisha Katona.

Episodes
 Celebrity was eliminated
 Celebrity won the cooking battle
 Celebrity finished in third place
 Celebrity was the runner-up
 Celebrity was the winner

Episode 1: British
In the first episode, the first four celebrities competed against each other in two separate heats, with the theme being traditional British dishes. The winner of each heat advanced to the next week, whilst the losers competed in the cook-off and one celebrity was eliminated.

Cook-off

Episode 2: Italian
In the second episode, the remaining four celebrities competed in two separate heats. The week's theme was Italian dishes. The winner of each heat advanced to the next week, whilst the losers competed in the cook-off and one celebrity was eliminated.

Cook-off

Episode 3: Indian
In the third episode, the remaining celebrities prepared Indian dishes in the cooking competitions that consisted of two heats featuring three celebrities. The judges then decided which celebrity to send to the cook-off, whilst the other two celebrities were advanced to the next week.

Cook-off

Episode 4: French
In the fourth episode, the theme was French dishes. The contestants competed in two heats, and due to the odd number of contestants, the first featured two celebrities and the second featured three celebrities, with the loser of each heat competing in the cook-off as normal and one celebrity was eliminated.

Cook-off

Episode 5: Semi-final: South East Asian
In semi-final, the celebrities again competed in two heats, cooking South Asian dishes, with the winner advancing to the final, whilst the losing celebrities had to battle it out in the cook off for the remaining spot in the final.

Cook-off

Episode 6: Final: Signature
In the grand final, the final three celebrities are tasked with cooking their mentor chef's signature dish, before the chefs decide which one of them will advance to the final cooking competition, and the two losers go head to head in a cook-off to win the second spot. In the final cooking battle, the remaining two celebrities prepare a dish they’d cooked previously in a bid to be crowned champion.
 

Third place cook-off

Final cooking battle

Series 2 (2022)
The celebrities competing in the second series were announced on 11 April 2022.

Reception
The series received positive reviews from critics, with Ben Dowell of The Times describing the show as "exciting, charming and fun with accomplished editing helping to strain every drop of tension."

References

External links
 
 
 

2021 British television series debuts
2020s British reality television series
2020s British cooking television series
British cooking television shows
ITV reality television shows
English-language television shows